Fáskrúðsfjörður (previously named also Búðir ) is a village (þorp) in eastern Iceland.

It has a population of 662 (as of 2011) and constitutes one of the villages composing the municipality of Fjarðabyggð.

Geography
Fáskrúðsfjörður, located on the same-named fjord, lies between Reyðarfjörður and Stöðvarfjörður. It is one of the easternmost settlements of Iceland.

The other neighbouring villages which compose the municipality of Fjarðabyggð are: Eskifjörður (1,043 inh.), Mjóifjörður (35 inh.), Neskaupstaður (1,437 inh.), Reyðarfjörður (1,102 inh.) and Stöðvarfjörður (203 inh.).

History and culture
Fáskrúðsfjörður was home to a hospital founded to serve French fishermen working here until 1935. The former hospital building dating from 1903 has now been restored as a hotel. Even nowadays there are bilingual signs in town indicating the street names in Icelandic and in French. The French cemetery with 49 graves of fishermen from France and Belgium is another tourist attraction. The cross was erected in 2009.

The village is now a centre for visitors viewing the Northern Lights.

Attractions
There are tour operators offering trips by boat to the small uninhabited island Skrúður which is famous for its large variety of sea birds, especially for its puffins. In the east of Fáskrúðsfjörður, on the farm Kolfreyjustaður a church (Kolfreyjustaðakirkja) was built of driftwood  in 1878, which is famous for its wall paintings dating from 1957 and for its retable painted by the Danish artist Niels Anker Lund (1840–1922). Vattarnesviti is an orange lighthouse  on the peninsula of Vattarnes in the northeast of Fáskrúðsfjörður built in 1957.

Twin towns
 Gravelines (France)

Photogallery

References

External links

 Fáskrúðsfjörður page on Fjarðabyggð municipal website

Populated places in Eastern Region (Iceland)
Fjords of Iceland